Beñat Etxebarria Urkiaga (born 19 February 1987), known mononymously as Beñat, is a Spanish former professional footballer who played as a central midfielder.

He spent the better part of his professional career with Athletic Bilbao, appearing in 242 competitive matches and scoring 11 goals while winning the 2015 Supercopa de España. In La Liga, he also represented Betis.

Beñat earned four caps for the Spain national team.

Club career

Athletic Bilbao
Beñat was born in Igorre, Biscay. Coming through Athletic Bilbao's prolific youth ranks at Lezama, he played his first three years with both the third team, CD Basconia, and the reserve side.

On 29 October 2006, he appeared in his first – and only – La Liga game, which consisted of six minutes against CA Osasuna in a 1–1 away draw after replacing another youth product, Francisco Yeste.

Betis

In 2008–09, Beñat played with UB Conquense in Segunda División B, after which he was released by Athletic. In the summer he signed with Real Betis, but spent his first season with the reserves also in the third tier.

Beñat made his debut for Betis' main squad on 29 August 2010, playing 20 minutes in the 4–1 home win against Granada CF and being involved in the play that led to Salva Sevilla's goal. Three days later he scored in his first start, a 2–1 home victory over UD Salamanca in the Copa del Rey. In the league campaign he contributed 36 matches (30 starts, 2.521 minutes of action) as the Andalusians returned to the top flight after three years, netting four times.

On 2 May 2012, Beñat scored twice for his fifth and sixth goals of the season, in a 2–1 defeat of Sevilla FC for the local derby. The winner came in the 90th minute.

Beñat scored the game's only goal in a 1–0 home win over Real Madrid on 24 November 2012, with a shot from outside the 18-yard box in the 17th minute. He finished the campaign with 34 games, four goals and seven assists, helping the club finish seventh and qualify to the UEFA Europa League.

Athletic return
Beñat returned to Athletic Bilbao in June 2013, signing a five-year contract for a reported fee of €8 million. On 16 September, he took the first touch at the new San Mamés Stadium against RC Celta de Vigo and scored the 3–2 winner; he was substituted to a standing ovation, and dedicated his performance to his grandparents.

On 14 April 2016, Beñat was the only player to miss in a penalty shootout against compatriots Sevilla in the quarter-finals of the Europa League. Following the appointment of manager José Ángel Ziganda for the 2017–18 season, he began featuring less regularly.

In July 2020, Athletic confirmed that Beñat's contract would not be extended beyond that summer, although the departure was delayed beyond its usual June expiry after the season was postponed due to the COVID-19 pandemic in Spain. His contribution (along with long-serving colleague Mikel San José, also leaving in similar circumstances) was acknowledged at the last home fixture on 16 July 2020 in an empty San Mamés– he was in the matchday squad but did not leave the bench, with his last appearance five months earlier; he had been involved in the side's run to the Spanish Cup final, but the circumstances of the delay and the end of his spell at the club meant he would have no opportunity to take part in the decisive match.

Macarthur
Beñat moved abroad for the first time at the age of 33, joining Australian A-League newcomers Macarthur FC on 13 November 2020. Both he and his compatriot and former Athletic teammate Markel Susaeta retired at the end of the campaign, aged 34.

International career
Beñat played with the Spanish youth teams at under-17 level. He made his debut for the full side on 26 May 2012, playing 45 minutes in a 2–0 friendly win with Serbia in St. Gallen and thus becoming the first Betis player since Juanito to don the national team shirt, nearly four years later.

Career statistics

Club

International

Honours
Betis
Segunda División: 2010–11

Athletic Bilbao
Supercopa de España: 2015

References

External links

1987 births
Living people
People from Arratia-Nerbioi
Sportspeople from Biscay
Spanish footballers
Footballers from the Basque Country (autonomous community)
Association football midfielders
La Liga players
Segunda División players
Segunda División B players
Tercera División players
CD Basconia footballers
Bilbao Athletic footballers
Athletic Bilbao footballers
UB Conquense footballers
Betis Deportivo Balompié footballers
Real Betis players
A-League Men players
Macarthur FC players
Spain youth international footballers
Spain international footballers
Basque Country international footballers
Spanish expatriate footballers
Expatriate soccer players in Australia
Spanish expatriate sportspeople in Australia